A list of locks on the Grand Union Canal and its branches.

Grand Union Canal (Main Line) 
The Grand Union Canal (Main Line) runs from Salford Junction, Birmingham to Brentford, London. Locks have a beam of 14 feet except locks 52 to 64 in Birmingham. The numbering of locks originates at Braunston, and increases both towards the north, to Lock 64, and the south, to Lock 101.

Grand Union Canal branches 

The Paddington Arm and the Slough Arm have no locks.

The Wendover Arm Canal has one stop lock.

The Aylesbury Arm has 16 locks, see Aylesbury Canal Society.

The Leicester Branch from Norton Junction to the River Trent has 59 locks, see table.

The Welford Arm, off the Leicester Branch, has one lock, Welford Lock with a rise of 3’ 6”.

The Northampton Arm from Gayton Junction to the River Nene has 17 locks, see table.

Locks on the Leicester Branch 

The lock numbering sequence of the Leicester Branch continues along the Erewash Canal. From Lock 60 Trent Lock north to Lock 74 at Eastwood.

Locks on the Northampton Arm

See also 

 Grand Union Canal

References 

Locks of England